Mathew Valencia (born December 12, 1983) is a former American actor.

Career
Valencia is best known as the voice of Tim Drake in a starring role in The New Batman Adventures (1997-1999) and in a supporting appearance in Superman: The Animated Series (1996-2000) as well as the younger version of the character in Batman Beyond: Return of the Joker (2000), all set in the DC Animated Universe.

Filmography

Film

Television

References

External links

1983 births
Living people
American male child actors
American male voice actors